is a Japanese professional rock climber, sport climber and boulderer. She participates in both bouldering and lead climbing competitions. She won the IFSC Climbing Asian Youth Championships in lead and bouldering events in 2016, as well as Bouldering Japan Cup in 2017. She participated in combined and speed events at the 2018 Asian Games.

Biography 
Ito was born on 25 April 2002, in Morioka, Iwate Prefecture, Japan. She started climbing in her third year of elementary school, encouraged by her father who did sport climbing as a hobby. Her talent was apparent from early on; on her first day of climbing, she reportedly surprised her father by climbing 15 meters up high without stopping, despite not having had any prior climbing experience.

She started taking part in public tournaments in 2014, when she came in second place at the 17th Junior Olympic Cup in the under-Youth B age group in lead climbing.

In 2015, she achieved victory in the Japan Youth Championships lead event (under-Youth B age group), and the All Japan Climbing Youth Championships Bouldering Tournament (Youth C). In the same year, she also won both the lead and bouldering events (Youth C) while representing Japan in the IFSC Climbing Asian Youth Championships in Putrajaya, Malaysia.

In 2016, she entered the All Japan Climbing Championships Lead Tournament, where she came 3rd in the girls' senior category, and won the Youth B category. In November of the same year she represented Japan in the IFSC World Youth Championships in Guangzhou, China, where she came 2nd in bouldering in the girls' Youth B category.

In January 2017, Ito won the 12th Sport Climbing Bouldering Japan Cup, where she faced the more experienced Japanese climbers Akiyo Noguchi and Miho Nonaka. At 14 years and 9 months, Ito was youngest person ever to win the Japan Cup, beating Noguchi's 16 years and 3 months at the first Japan Cup in 2005. She was also the youngest athlete to represent Japan in the 2018 Bouldering World Cup, where she placed 8th.

In August 2018 she participated in combined and speed events at the Asian Games, held in Palembang, Indonesia.

In 2019 she won the Adidas Rockstars bouldering competition. In this event she defeated Janja Garnbret in the superfinal.

Rankings

IFSC Climbing World Cup

IFSC World Youth Championships

References

External links 

2002 births
Living people
Japanese rock climbers
Sport climbers at the 2018 Asian Games
Asian Games competitors for Japan